The Regional Mexican Albums, published in Billboard magazine, is a record chart that features Latin music sales information for regional styles of Mexican music. This data are compiled by Nielsen SoundScan from a sample that includes music stores, music departments at department stores and verifiable sales from concert venues in the United States.  Billboard would publish a bi weekly chart up until July 17, 1993 when Billboard switched to publishing a weekly chart going forward.

Albums

References 

United States Regional Albums
1993 in Latin music
Regional Mexican 1993